Dona Francisca (2 August 1824 – 27 March 1898) was a princess of the Empire of Brazil (as daughter of Emperor Dom Pedro I, who also reigned as King Dom Pedro IV of Portugal, and his wife Maria Leopoldina of Habsburg), who became Princess of Joinville upon marrying François d’Orléans, son of the French king Louis Philippe I. The couple had three children. Through their oldest daughter, Francisca and François are the ancestors of Jean, Count of Paris, the present Orléanist pretender to the French throne.

Biography

Francisca was born on 2 August 1824 in the Palace of São Cristóvão, in Rio de Janeiro, capital of the Empire of Brazil. Her name in full was Francisca Carolina Joana Carlota Leopoldina Romana Xavier de Paula Micaela Gabriela Rafaela Gonzaga. Through her father, Emperor Dom Pedro I, she was a member of the Brazilian branch of the House of Braganza (Portuguese: Bragança) and was referred to using the honorific "Dona" (Lady) from birth. Her mother was the Archduchess Maria Leopoldina of Austria, daughter of Franz II, the last Holy Roman Emperor. Through her, Francisca was a niece of Napoleon Bonaparte and first cousin of Emperors Napoleon II of France, Franz Joseph I (Francis Joseph I) of Austria-Hungary and Don Maximiliano I (Maximilian I) of Mexico.

Francisca married Prince François of Orléans, the third son of Louis Philippe I and his Italian Queen Maria Amalia of Naples. François called the Prince of Joinville, and Francisca married in Rio de Janeiro on 1 May 1843. The bride was 19, the groom 25. Her portrait was painted when she arrived in Paris, in 1844, by Ary Scheffer (coll. Musée de la Vie romantique, Paris).

Their only daughter Princess Françoise of Orléans married her first cousin Prince Robert, Duke of Chartres and became the mother of the Orléanist pretender Prince Jean, Duke of Guise. Her son Pierre never married, but had two illegitimate children by a married woman.

When the Orléans family fled France, they settled in England living at Claremont; It was there that Francisca gave birth to a stillborn daughter in 1849; the next year, the exiled King Louis Philippe I died himself. After the fall of the House of Bonaparte of the Second Empire, the Orléans family returned to France; Francisca herself died in Paris aged 73. Her husband outlived her by two years, dying in Paris in 1900.

Gallery

Issue
Princess Françoise of Orléans (14 August 1844 – 28 October 1925) married her cousin Prince Robert, Duke of Chartres and had issue.
Prince Pierre, Duke of Penthièvre (4 November 1845 – 17 July 1919) never married, but had two children with Angélique Lebesgue.
Princess Marie Léopoldine of Orléans (30 October 1849) stillborn daughter born at Claremont.

Ancestry

Footnotes

References 

 
 

1824 births
1898 deaths
House of Braganza
Brazilian princesses
Princesses of France (Orléans)
19th-century Brazilian people
19th-century Brazilian women
Burials at the Chapelle royale de Dreux
Princesses of Joinville
Brazilian people of Austrian descent
Brazilian people of Portuguese descent
Knights Grand Cross of the Order of the Immaculate Conception of Vila Viçosa
Dames of the Order of Saint Isabel
Daughters of emperors
Daughters of kings